Giovanni Benedetto Paolazzi (1700–1788)  was an Italian painter of the late-Baroque period, active in Bologna, mainly in ornamental and quadratura painting.

Biography
He trained initially under Antonio Dardani, and learned quadratura from Tommaso Aldrovandini. He was a member of the Accademia Clementina and died in Bologna. Paolazzi help decorate some of the rooms in the Palazzo Malvezzi Campeggi.

References

1700 births
1788 deaths
18th-century Italian painters
Italian male painters
Quadratura painters
Painters from Bologna
18th-century Italian male artists